Azteca 7 (also called El Siete) is a Mexican network owned by TV Azteca, with more than 100 main transmitters all over Mexico.

Azteca 7 is available on all cable and satellite systems. A substantial portion of their purchased programming includes many series purchased from networks such as Disney Channel Latin America, Cartoon Network Latin America and Nickelodeon Latin America among others; while the series aimed at the general public often comes from major alliances like The Walt Disney Company, Fox Broadcasting Company, Sony Pictures, Warner Bros., NBCUniversal and Paramount Global among others.

History

Imevisión's channel 7
To bring a channel 7 to Mexico City, which had channels 2, 4, 5, 8, 11 and 13, a channel shuffle had to be made. This channel shuffle converted Televisa's station XHTM-TV channel 8 to channel 9. Two Puebla stations, XEX-TV channel 7 and XEQ-TV channel 9, moved to channels 8 and 10; XEQ took on the XHTM callsign that was discontinued in Mexico City. In Toluca, channel 7 (XHGEM-TV) was moved to channel 12, and XHTOL-TV moved from channel 9 to 10. XHIMT-TV took to the air on May 15, 1985, as the third of three Mexico City stations operated by public broadcaster Imevisión, sister to XHDF-TV channel 13 and XEIMT-TV channel 22, and the flagship station of a second Imevisión national network which featured 99 repeater stations serving 72% of the population. The new Red Nacional 7 (7 National Network) was positioned as targeting the working class and rural areas, while Red Nacional 13, based from XHDF, targeted a more middle- and upper-class audience.

TV Azteca's channel 7
However, financial mismanagement, economic troubles and other issues quickly signaled trouble for Imevisión. In 1990, XEIMT and XHIMT were converted into relays of XHDF, and the next year, the government of Mexico announced it was selling XHIMT and XHDF to the private sector. The sale of these two networks in 1993 formed the new TV Azteca network.

By October 1993, XHIMT was operating independently under Azteca as Tú Visión. The programming of Azteca 7 since then has largely consisted of children's programs, sports, foreign series and movies, serving as a competitor to Televisa's Canal 5.

Programs

Foreign shows aired on Azteca 7 include American Ninja Warrior, The Simpsons, Elementary, and Hawaii Five-0.

Sports

After its privatization, Azteca 7 began carrying NBA basketball, though Televisa now holds these rights. Soccer rights on Azteca 7 includes the Liga MX, as well as all official and friendly matches of the Mexico national soccer team. Azteca 7 also carries NFL games, boxing (Box Azteca) and lucha libre (Lucha Azteca).

Azteca 7 transmitters
Azteca 7 has 89 full-power transmitters that broadcast its programming; it also is carried, albeit in SD, as a subchannel of 14 additional Azteca Uno transmitters. Except in the border cities of Tijuana, Mexicali and Ciudad Juárez, Azteca 7 is exclusively mapped to virtual channel 7 nationwide.

|-

|-

|-

|-

|-

|-

|-

|-

|-

|-

|-

|-

|-

|-

|-

|-

|-

|-

|-

|-

|-

|-

|-

|-

|-

|-

|-

|-

|-

|-

|-

|-

|-

|-

|-

|-

|-

|-

|-

|-

|-

|-

|-

|-

|-

|-

|-

|-

|-

|-

|-

|-

|-

|-

|-

|-

|-

|-

|-

|-

|-

|-

|-

|-

|-

|-

|-

|-

|-

|-

|-

|-

|-

|-

|-

|-

|-

|-

|-

|-

|-

|-

|-

|-

|-

|-

|-

|-

|-

|-

|-

|-

|-

|-

|-

|-

|-

|-
 
|}

References

External links
Azteca 7 website 
TV Azteca website 

 
Television channels and stations established in 1991
Television networks in Mexico
TV Azteca broadcast television networks
1991 establishments in Mexico